Jong Ambon Football Club (simply known as Jong Ambon or JAFC) is an Indonesian football club based in Ambon, Maluku. They currently compete in the Liga 3.

References

External links

Football clubs in Indonesia
Football clubs in Maluku (province)
Association football clubs established in 2020
2020 establishments in Indonesia